Luis Arredondo (born 24 June 1952) is a Mexican judoka. He competed in the men's middleweight event at the 1972 Summer Olympics.

References

External links
 

1952 births
Living people
Mexican male judoka
Olympic judoka of Mexico
Judoka at the 1972 Summer Olympics
Place of birth missing (living people)
20th-century Mexican people